21st Century Schizoid Band were a King Crimson alumnus group formed in 2002.

The name derives from the famous song "21st Century Schizoid Man" from the first King Crimson album, In the Court of the Crimson King. The initial band featured Mel Collins on saxophones, flute and keyboards, Michael Giles on drums, Peter Giles on bass, Ian McDonald on alto saxophone, flute and keyboards, and Jakko Jakszyk on guitar and vocals. All but Jakszyk had previously been members of King Crimson in its early years. Ian Wallace, another former Crimson member from that period, replaced Michael Giles in early 2003 after the band's Japanese tour. Further international touring followed in 2003/04.

The band played live with sets concentrating on compositions from King Crimson's first four albums and other works from the band members' back catalogues, including McDonald and Giles. They have released four albums, mostly of live work but including newer and/or recent compositions, such as Ian McDonald's "Let There Be Light" (from his solo album Driver's Eyes) and "Catley's Ashes", a Jakszyk instrumental which later appeared on his solo album The Bruised Romantic Glee Club (2006).

The band has been inactive since 2004; with members based in different countries, touring proved to be logistically and financially difficult. The possibility of performing again in 2005 was considered following offers from festivals, possibly with Guy Evans (of Van der Graaf Generator) on drums to replace Wallace who had other commitments, but the idea was abandoned. Wallace's death in February 2007 would seem to have closed the lid on the band for good.

Jakszyk and Collins went on to record as a trio with founding Crimson guitarist Robert Fripp (and with rhythmic support from fellow members Tony Levin and Gavin Harrison) on the Scarcity of Miracles album in 2011. This was followed in 2013 by the announcement of a new King Crimson formation including all five, plus two additional members.

Average setlists

2002 

 Pictures of a City 
 Cat Food 
 Let There Be Light 
 Progress 
 The Court of the Crimson King 
 Formentera Lady 
 Tomorrow's People 
 If I Was 
 Ladies of the Road 
 I Talk to the Wind 
 Epitaph 
 Birdman 

Encore:

 21st Century Schizoid Man

2003 

 A Man, a City 
 Cat Food 
 Let There Be Light 
 Cirkus 
 Flute Trio 
 Cadence and Cascade 
 The Court of the Crimson King 
 Ladies of the Road 
 Catley's Ashes 
 21st Century Schizoid Man 
 Formentera Lady 
 I Talk to the Wind 
 Epitaph 
 Birdman 

Encore:

 Starless

2004 

 Pictures of a City 
 Cat Food 
 Let There Be Light 
 Cirkus 
 Cadence and Cascade 
 The Court of the Crimson King 
 Ladies of the Road 
 Catley's Ashes 
 Formentera Lady 
 Sailor's Tale 
 I Talk to the Wind 
 Epitaph 
 21st Century Schizoid Man 
 Birdman 

Encore:

 Starless

Band members 

 Jakko Jakszyk – lead vocals, guitar, flute 
 Mel Collins – saxophones, flute, keyboards, backing vocals 
 Michael Giles – drums, percussion, vocals 
 Peter Giles – bass, backing vocals 
 Ian McDonald – alto saxophone, flute, keyboards, vocals 
 Ian Wallace – drums, percussion, vocals

Discography
Official Bootleg V.1 (2002)
Live in Japan (2003, CD and DVD) (re-released Films Media Group, [2013]
Live in Italy (2003)
Pictures of a City – Live in New York  (2006)

Albums performed members contributed to

References

2002 establishments in England
2004 disestablishments in England
English progressive rock groups
King Crimson
Musical groups established in 2002
Musical groups disestablished in 2004